Edward Matthew Lauter Jr. (October 30, 1938 – October 16, 2013) was an American actor and stand-up comedian. He appeared in more than 200 films and TV series episodes in a career that spanned over 40 years.

Early life
Lauter was born and raised in Long Beach, New York, the son of Edward Matthew Lauter and Sally Lee, a 1920s Broadway actress and dancer. He was of German and Irish descent.

After graduating from high school, he majored in English Literature in college and received a B.A. degree in 1961 from the C.W. Post campus of Long Island University. While in college, he played basketball. Lauter served for two years in the United States Army.

Career
Lauter's first acting role was a small part in the Broadway production of The Great White Hope, a boxing drama, in 1968. Before that, he was a stand-up comedian. His screen acting debut was in a 1971 episode of the television series Mannix. His first theatrical film role was in the Western Dirty Little Billy in 1972.

As a character actor, Lauter was known for his 6'2" height and balding looks. He starred with Bruce Dern, Barbara Harris, Karen Black, and William Devane in Alfred Hitchcock's final film, Family Plot. Hitchcock was impressed by Lauter and asked him to play a major role in the romantic espionage thriller he planned as his next film; the director's failing health and eventual death in 1980 meant that The Short Night never went into production.

Lauter appeared in many films, including half a dozen in 1972 alone. Among his most prominent film roles were The Longest Yard (a.k.a. The Mean Machine) (1974), King Kong (1976), Magic (1978), Death Hunt (1981), Timerider (1982), Cujo (1983), Death Wish 3 (1985), My Blue Heaven (1990), The Rocketeer (1991), Seraphim Falls (2006), and The Artist (2011).

Lauter's television appearances included the role as the villain sheriff Martin Stillman in the How the West Was Won TV series, and guest-performances on The New Land, Psych, The X-Files (as Mulder's childhood hero, Gemini astronaut Col. Marcus Aurelius Belt in the season 1 episode "Space"), The Streets of San Francisco (on the series debut episode),  Kojak, The A-Team, Miami Vice (season 3 episode 6 Shadow in the Dark), Magnum, P.I. (episode Operation Silent Night), Booker, Charmed, Highlander: The Series, Law & Order, Star Trek: The Next Generation (as Lt. Cmdr. Albert in the season 5 episode "The First Duty"), The Equalizer, The Waltons, and ER (with a recurring role as Fire Captain Dannaker).

Death

On October 16, 2013, two weeks before his 75th birthday, Lauter died of mesothelioma, a rare form of cancer, having been diagnosed five months earlier in May.

Following his death, Lauter's family filed a wrongful death lawsuit against many well-known broadcasting, automotive, and manufacturing companies for exposing Lauter to asbestos, which led to his death. The suit alleges that Lauter was exposed to asbestos at various movie studios and location sets over his 40-year career as an actor in Los Angeles.  The lawsuit remains pending as of late 2020.

Married five times, he is survived by his fifth wife, Mia Lauter, and his four children from previous marriages. He continued to work until a few months before his death, completing roles in several films still to be released after his death.

To honor his work, the Ed Lauter Foundation is being established, which will award a scholarship yearly to aspiring young actors. Reflecting on his lengthy career, Lauter said in a 2012 interview with the Los Angeles Times:

Filmography

Film

Television

References

External links
 
 
 Ed Lauter(Aveleyman)
 Ed Lauter at Find a Grave

1938 births
2013 deaths
American male film actors
American male television actors
American people of German descent
American people of Irish descent
Burials at Westwood Village Memorial Park Cemetery
Deaths from cancer in California
Deaths from mesothelioma
LIU Post alumni
Male actors from New York (state)
People from Long Beach, New York